Nina Krebs Ovesen (born 20 February 1996) is a Danish professional racing cyclist. She rides for Team Rytger.

See also
 List of 2015 UCI Women's Teams and riders

References

External links

1996 births
Living people
Danish female cyclists
Place of birth missing (living people)
21st-century Danish women